Keshav Kumar (born 6 February 2001) is a Singaporean footballer currently playing as a defender for Balestier Khalsa.

Career statistics

Club

Notes

References

2001 births
Living people
Singaporean footballers
Association football defenders
Singapore Premier League players
Balestier Khalsa FC players
Singaporean sportspeople of Indian descent